The Monastery of Santa Maria de Ripoll is a Benedictine monastery, built in the Romanesque style, located in the town of Ripoll in Catalonia, Spain. Although much of the present church is 19th century rebuilding, the sculptured portico is a renowned work of Romanesque art.

History

The Monastery of Santa Maria de Ripoll was founded in 888 by Count Wilfred the Hairy (called Guifré el Pilós in Catalan) who used it as a centre to bring about the repopulation of the region after conquering it. Wilfred's son, Ridulph, was educated there and was later abbot of the monastery, as well as bishop of Urgell. The monastery grew rapidly, and was subsequently reconsecrated in 935, 977 and 1032, though the monks are known to have been established there permanently only from 1025 or 1032. The scriptorium and the monastic school quickly gained renown under Arnold Scholasticus. The monastery had several offshoots which included the abbeys of St. Martin-du-Canigou (now in France) and that of Santa Maria de Montserrat. It was also known for its collection of manuscripts which numbered 246 by the year 1046, and later included the 13th century Gesta comitum Barcinonensium, considered to be the first history of Catalonia and written by the monks themselves.

From 1070 to 1169 the monastery was governed by the Abbey of St. Victor of Marseille. Santa Maria de Ripoll was the main religious center of Catalonia until the 15th century, when it started to decline, beginning with the loss of control over the Monastery of Montserrat in 1402. In 1428 it was severely damaged by an earthquake, after which it was restored with the new parts in Gothic style.

The monastery became the family mausoleum for the Counts of Barcelona and Counts of Besalú, and well as a great center of learning, with a large library.

The library and much of the monastery's vast archives were destroyed by fire in 1835, after it had been secularized. In 1847 part of the cloister was demolished, followed in 1856 by the abbey palace. It was rebuilt in 1886, under the direction of architect Elias Rogent, the basilica being consecrated in 1896.

Architecture
The original monastic church had a nave and four aisles, roofed by barrel vaults. The nave and aisle terminated in five apses, later increased to seven when apses were added to the transepts also.  The current church dates to Rogent's reconstruction in 1896, and although maintaining features of the original church, the present building has only two aisles. The transept houses the tombs of the counts of Besalú and of several counts of Barcelona, from Wilfred the Hairy to Ramón Berenguer IV.

The cloister contains more of the original structure than the church itself, the first floor having been built between 1180 and the early 15th century. The second floor dates to the 15th and 16th century. It is formed, on each side, by thirteen semicircular arches supported by small pairs of columns with carved Corinthian-like capitals, sculpted by Pere Gregori and Jordi de Déu. Each one of the latter has a different decoration, inspired by mythological themes or by daily life.

The portal, although damaged by fires and restored in modern times, is a notable example of Catalan Romanesque sculpture. The frontal section features a relief from the mid-13th century (stylistically similar to the tomb of Ramón Berenguer III in the cloister), divided in seven horizontal bands. The upper two show God enthroned, near whom are the symbols of the Four Evangelists; the scene is completed by several angels in adoration and the Twenty-four Elders. The central bands are dedicated to the story of David and Solomon (left) and Moses (right). At the bottom are various mythical animals commonly identified with the visions of the prophet Daniel.

The portico is flanked by two statues, nearly destroyed, of St. Peter and St. Paul. Around them are various scenes, including the stories of Cain and Abel, that of Jonah and others.

Notable interments
 Wilfred the Hairy
 Ramon Berenguer III, Count of Barcelona
 Ramon Berenguer IV, Count of Barcelona
 Bernat Tallaferro, Count of Besalú
 Radulf, Abbot of Ripoll, son of Wilfred the Hairy

Also buried at the abbey, but in a now-unknown place:
 Sunifred II, Count of Barcelona, also known as Sunyer, Count of Barcelona
 Miro I, Count of Barcelona
 Berenguer Ramon I, Count of Barcelona

See also 
 Romanesque architecture 
 Romanesque art
 List of regional characteristics of Romanesque churches 
 Santiago de Compostela Cathedral
 History of medieval Arabic and Western European domes

Notes

References

236

External links

 
 

Maria de Ripoll
879 establishments
Christian monasteries established in the 9th century
Romanesque architecture in Catalonia
9th-century establishments in Spain
Burial sites of the House of Barcelona